The New York City Landmarks Preservation Commission (LPC), formed in 1965, is the New York City governmental commission that administers the city's Landmarks Preservation Law. Since its founding, it has designated over a thousand landmarks, classified into four categories: individual landmarks, interior landmarks, scenic landmarks, and historic districts.

The New York City borough of the Bronx contains numerous landmarks designated by the LPC, several interior landmarks and historic districts. The following is an incomplete list. Some of these are also National Historic Landmark (NHL) sites, and NHL status is noted where known.

Historic districts

Individual landmarks

Interior landmarks

See also 
 Lists of New York City Landmarks
 National Register of Historic Places listings in Bronx County, New York

References

External links
 https://web.archive.org/web/20081007221525/http://www.nyc.gov/html/lpc/html/forms/reports_bronx.shtml
 http://www.neighborhoodpreservationcenter.org/designation_reports/

Bronx
Locally designated landmarks in the United States
Landmarks
New York City Landmarks Preservation Commission
Bronx